Harry Fulton McLeod (September 14, 1871 – January 7, 1921) was a Canadian  lawyer and political figure in New Brunswick, Canada. He represented York County in the Legislative Assembly of New Brunswick from 1908 to 1913. Then he represented York and York—Sunbury in the House of Commons of Canada from 1913 to 1921 as a Conservative and later as a Unionist member.

Biography 
McLeod was born in Fredericton, New Brunswick on September 14, 1871. He served as mayor of Fredericton from 1907 to 1908. He was a lieutenant colonel in the Canadian Expeditionary Force during World War I.

He married Ina F. Mercereau in December 1908.

He died in office, at his home in Fredericton, on January 7, 1921.

Electoral history

References 

 

1871 births
1921 deaths
Members of the House of Commons of Canada from New Brunswick
Conservative Party of Canada (1867–1942) MPs
Members of the Legislative Assembly of New Brunswick
Mayors of Fredericton